Pavao is a Croatian masculine given name, cognate to Paul.

It may refer to:

 Pavao Anđelić (1920–1985), Bosnian archaeologist and historian
 Pavao Dragičević (1694–1773), Bosnian Franciscan friar and bishop
 Pavao Ljubičić (1918–1944), Croatian rower
 Pavao Löw (1910–1986), Yugoslav Jewish football player
 Pavao Martić (born 1940), Croatian rower
 Pavao Mašić (born 1980), Croatian harpsichordist and organist
 Pavao Miljavac (born 1953), Croatian general
 Pavao Muhić (1811–1897), Croatian lawyer and politician
 Pavao Pavličić (born 1946), Croatian writer
 Pavao Pervan (born 1987), Austrian football player of Bosnian Croat origin
 Pavao Pintarić (1913–1990), Yugoslav fencer
 Pavao Posilović (1597–1657), Croatian Catholic bishop
 Pavao Rajzner (1942–2015), Croatian football player and manager
 Pavao Rauch (1865–1933), Croatian politician
 Pavao Ritter Vitezović (1652–1713), Habsburg-Croatian polymath
 Pavao Tijan (1908–1997), Croatian encyclopaedist
 Pavao Zorčić (c.1620–1685), Croatian Greek Catholic hierarch
 Pavao Špirančić (c. 1400–1463), Croatian nobleman
 Pavao Štalter (born 1929), Croatian animator
 Pavao Štoos (1806–1862), Croatian poet and priest
 Pavao Šubić (c. 1245–1312), Croatian nobleman
 Pavao Žanić (1918–2000), Croatian Catholic bishop

See also
 Pavo (given name)
 Pajo (given name)
 Pavle
 Pavel

Croatian masculine given names